Ronald Washington Jr., better known by his stage name Wash, is an American singer.

Life and career
Ronald Washington Jr. grew up in Port Arthur, Texas. His parents were both pastors, who encouraged him to learn to play drums. He later learned to play saxophone and piano. His stage name, Wash, originated as abbreviation of his surname. In between working as a welder and scaffold builder, Wash uploaded covers of songs onto the internet, which came to the attention of songwriter and recorded producer Chef Tone. Wash was brought into Chef Tone's Aye Girl Music Group in 2013, and was signed to Interscope Records in 2014.

On September 30, 2014 Wash's first single, titled "Can't Trust Thots" and featuring American rapper French Montana, was released. In 2015, it reached numbers 35 and 44 on the US Billboard Rhythmic and Hot R&B/Hip-Hop Airplay charts, respectively.

In a January 2015 interview with Billboard, Wash said he would be releasing a mixtape titled Five Miles to Port Arthur by the end of March 2015. Wash released a single on June 17, 2016 named,"Where you been", featuring American rapper Kevin Gates. Both songs have been well received and have earned 5 star ratings on iTunes and good radio play.

Musical style and influences
David Jeffries of AllMusic describes Wash's style as predominantly R&B with nuances of hip hop music. Wash has mentioned Marvin Gaye, R. Kelly and Usher as influences on him.

References

External links

American rhythm and blues singers
People from Port Arthur, Texas
Singers from Texas